North Alamo is a census-designated place (CDP) in Hidalgo County, Texas. The population was 3,235 at the 2010 United States Census. It is part of the McAllen–Edinburg–Mission Metropolitan Statistical Area.

Geography
North Alamo is located at  (26.214649, -98.124075).

Demographics
As of the census of 2000, there were 2,061 people, 565 households, and 496 families residing in the CDP. The population density was 1,148.9 people per square mile (444.6/km2). There were 913 housing units at an average density of 509.0/sq mi (196.9/km2). The racial makeup of the CDP was 96.70% White, 2.18% from other races, and 1.12% from two or more races. Hispanic or Latino of any race were 89.91% of the population.

There were 565 households, out of which 52.4% had children under the age of 18 living with them, 68.5% were married couples living together, 13.1% had a female householder with no husband present, and 12.2% were non-families. 11.2% of all households were made up of individuals, and 6.0% had someone living alone who was 65 years of age or older. The average household size was 3.65 and the average family size was 3.94.

In the CDP, the population was spread out, with 37.4% under the age of 18, 11.6% from 18 to 24, 27.9% from 25 to 44, 13.8% from 45 to 64, and 9.3% who were 65 years of age or older. The median age was 26 years. For every 100 females, there were 100.9 males. For every 100 females age 18 and over, there were 98.9 males.

The median income for a household in the CDP was $19,430, and the median income for a family was $19,357. Males had a median income of $21,250 versus $19,250 for females. The per capita income for the CDP was $8,857. About 47.1% of families and 53.6% of the population were below the poverty line, including 63.8% of those under age 18 and 34.8% of those age 65 or over.

Education
North Alamo is served by the Pharr-San Juan-Alamo Independent School District.

Elementary schools which serve sections of the community include Sgt. Leonel Trevino (inside the North Alamo CDP), Augusto Guerra, and Santos Livas (North Alamo). Secondary schools serving North Alamo are Audie Murphy Middle School, and Pharr-San Juan-Alamo Memorial High School.

In addition, South Texas Independent School District operates magnet schools that serve the community.

References

External links
 Sgt. Leonel Treviño Elementary School

Census-designated places in Hidalgo County, Texas
Census-designated places in Texas